Crooked Creek is an unincorporated community and census-designated place (CDP) in Logan County, West Virginia, United States. The CDP was first drawn for the 2020 census.

Crooked Creek is in central Logan County, in the valley of its namesake creek, a west-flowing tributary of the Guyandotte River. The community is bordered to the south by Peach Creek, in the valley of its own namesake creek.

References 

Census-designated places in West Virginia
Census-designated places in Logan County, West Virginia
Unincorporated communities in West Virginia
Unincorporated communities in Logan County, West Virginia